The Movement of the First is a youth movement in Russia, created on December 18, 2022, at the initiative of the country's leadership to educate, organize leisure activities for teenagers and form a worldview "based on traditional Russian spiritual and moral goals". Branches of the movement should be opened in every municipality of Russia, and primary cells of the movement can be created in each school. The bill on the creation of the movement was submitted to the State Duma on the day of the 100th anniversary of the Young Pioneers. They will be accepted into the organization from the age of six, and it will be possible to stay in it until graduation from school or college.

History 
On 19 May 2022, on the day of the 100th anniversary of the All-Union Pioneer Organization, a project was submitted to the State Duma on the creation of an all-Russian movement «Russian Movement of Children and Youth "Big Change"». On 7 June 2022, the State Duma adopted it. On 14 July Putin signed the Federal Law “On the Russian Movement of Children and Youth”. On 20 December 2022, at the organizational meeting at the Artek secondary school, the very first cell of the RDDM "Movement of the First" appeared. At the opening of the primary cell, the chairman of the Board of the Russian Movement of Children and Youth "Movement of the First" Grigory Gurov made an official appeal to Artek residents.

Organization 
The organization is under the personal supervision of the President of Russia, who directly controls all three permanent governing bodies: the supervisory board, the coordinating board and the board. He appoints the chairman of the board and the deputy of the supervisory board, and also heads the supervisory board. The supervisory board chairs the Coordinating Board and appoints the chairmen of the regional boards.

The supervisory board of the movement is headed by the President of the country Vladimir Putin, the chairman of the movement is Grigory Gurov. Those who have the status of foreign agents or persons not admitted to teaching activities cannot organize the education of members of the organization.

See also 

 Little Octobrists + Young Pioneers (Soviet Union)
 Scouting in Russia
 Young Army Cadets National Movement

References 

Child-related organizations
Organizations established in 2022
Organizations based in Russia